The Cornell Big Red men's lacrosse team represents Cornell University in NCAA Division I men's lacrosse.

History
As a member of the Ivy League, Cornell has won 30 conference championships (18 outright, 12 shared), more than any other school (Princeton has won 27 – 18 outright, 9 shared). The Ivy League awards the conference championship to the team with the best record at the conclusion of the regular season. If two or more teams are tied with the same record the championship is shared.

The team was undefeated and untied in league play during 17 of their 18 outright championships, the most of any Ivy team.

Since the introduction of the Ivy League lacrosse tournament in 2010 Cornell has won the tournament twice, in 2011 and 2018.

The Big Red have appeared in the NCAA lacrosse tournament 29 times.

They have won the three championships and were runner up five times, most recently in 2022 when they lost to Maryland 9-7.

Cornell maintains the oldest ongoing rivalry in college lacrosse with the Hobart College Statesmen. Their main Ivy League rivalry is with Princeton.

Cornell has claimed three NCAA national championships and four pre-NCAA era titles. Some of the all-time great lacrosse players and coaches have played for or coached the Big Red, including Mike French, Eamon McEneaney and Richie Moran.

In 2009, Max Seibald won the Tewaaraton Trophy, awarded to the "Most Outstanding" collegiate lacrosse player in the United States.

In 2013, Rob Pannell won the Tewaaraton Trophy while leading Cornell to the NCAA semifinals, also breaking the all-time NCAA career scoring mark that season.

Cornell played their first official season of lacrosse in 1892 and through 2022 have a record of 787–490–27 (.614).

Head Coaches 
Cornell has had twelve men's lacrosse head coaches since 1892:

 No Head Coach (1892-1914), 69-65-12, .514 winning percentage
 Talbot Hunter (1915-1916), 7-8-1 record, .469 winning percentage
 Nicholas Bawlf (1920-1939), 62-63-11 record, .496 winning percentage
 Ray Van Orman (1940–1949), 24-45 record, .348 winning percentage
 Ross H. Smith (1950-1961), 75-56-3 record, .571 winning percentage
 Robert Cullen (1962-1965), 16-24 record, .400 winning percentage
 Ned Harkness (1966-1968), 35-1 record, .972 winning percentage
 Richie Moran (1969-1997), 257-121 record, .680 winning percentage
 Dave Pietramala (1998-2000), 23-17 record, .576 winning percentage
 Jeff Tambroni (2001-2010), 109-40 record, .732 winning percentage
 Ben DeLuca (2011-2014), 37-10 record, .787 winning percentage
 Matt Kerwick (2014-2017), 32-26 record, .552 winning percentage
 Peter Milliman (2018-2020), 28-10 record, .737 winning percentage
 Connor Buczek (2021–Present), 14-5 record, .737 winning percentage, as of the 2022 season

As of the 2022 season, those coaches combined for a 788-492-27 record, which is a .616 winning percentage, with 3 total national titles.

Season results
The following is a list of Cornell's results by season:

{| class="wikitable"

|- align="center"

†NCAA and the Ivy League canceled 2020 and 2021 collegiate activities due to the COVID-19 pandemic.

References

External links
 

NCAA Division I men's lacrosse teams
Cornell Big Red men's lacrosse
1892 establishments in New York (state)
Lacrosse clubs established in 1892